Rohrdorf is a municipality  in the district of Rosenheim in Upper Bavaria, Germany. It is located in the Inn valley.

History

Rohrdorf was first mentioned in 788 in the notitia arnonis.

Evidence of prehistoric settlement in the village has been found.

During World War II, a subcamp of Dachau concentration camp was located here.

Twin towns 
  Rosate, Italy
  Schattendorf, Austria
  Tarnowo Podgórne, Poland

References

Rosenheim (district)
Populated places on the Inn (river)